Fidentius may refer to:

Fidentius and Terence, probably fictitious saints
Fidentius Armenus (fl. 2nd century), legendary saint
Fidentian (d. 304), bishop of Hippo Regius, martyr
Fidentius (fl. 411), Donatist bishop of Collo
Fidentius (fl. 705), bishop of Zuglio
Fidentius of Padua (fl. 1226–1291), Franciscan friar
Fidentius (fl. 1261–1274), bishop of Aversa